The black-eared mouse (Peromyscus melanotis), or black-eared deer mouse, is a species of rodent in the family Cricetidae, native to North America.

Description
The fur is tawny to yellow-brown over most of the body, fading from a darker shade on the back to paler on the flanks. The under parts and feet are pure white, with a clear dividing line from the tawny fur elsewhere. A narrow ring of dusky fur is found around the eyes, while the ears are dark brown to black, with white edges. The tail is furred, and has the same color as the body, being tawny above and white below. In at least some localities, the mouse has a slightly paler coat in winter than in summer.

The mouse is virtually identical in appearance to the closely related species Peromyscus sonoriensis (formerly referred to as P. maniculatus). Although subtle differences in the fur and shape of the skull occur between the species, the considerable overlap in the appearance of individuals means even these features cannot reliably be used to distinguish them. The two species can, however, be distinguished using genetic analysis. and are unable to successfully interbreed.

Distribution and habitat

Black-eared mice are found in regions of coniferous forest and mixed grassland throughout much of the central mountains of Mexico. They occur from the Neovolcanic range through the Sierra Madre Oriental and Occidental, and across the US border into mountainous regions of southern Arizona. In contrast, P. sonoriensis tends to live on lower slopes in the same region, although some overlap may occur in ravines and along forest edges.

Biology
Black-eared mice are nocturnal and omnivorous, feeding mainly on seeds and insects. Unusually, they are able to tolerate very bitter cardenolide chemicals, allowing them to consume relatively large quantities of monarch butterflies. They reportedly defend the territory around their nests from other species, in particular driving away Mexican volcano mice, where the two species are found together.

The mice breed throughout the year, giving birth to litters of up to five young, with three or four being typical. No subspecies are recognized.

References

External links
 iNaturalist
 Smithsonian

Peromyscus
Mammals described in 1897
Taxonomy articles created by Polbot
Mammals of Mexico
Mammals of the United States
Fauna of the Sierra Madre Occidental
Fauna of the Sierra Madre Oriental
Fauna of the Trans-Mexican Volcanic Belt